Manindra Nath Nayak (30 June 1897 – 28 December 1982) was a Bengali revolutionary and Indian independence activist.

Early life
Nayak was born in his maternal home at Chandannagar, Hooghly district in British India. His father name was Bhushan Chandra Nayak. Manidra Nath was the first science graduated person of Chandannnagar.  He passed B.Sc from Scottish Church College in 1913 but could not enter in Presidency College Calcutta for pursuing M.Sc due to police report.

Revolutionary activities
He was attracted to the revolutionary politics and member of secret society from student life. Nayak learnt to manufacture bombs by putting explosives in the empty shell of coconut even before Manicktala Conspiracy case. After that he was trained by Mr. Suresh Chandra Dutta, Professor of Ripon College, Calcutta to prepare improvised explosives. Rash Behari Bose sent bombs prepared by him to Lahore, and Delhi in 1912. The historic bomb used by Basanta Kumar Biswas which wounded Lord Hardinge, was made by him. Since he was a resident of Chandannagar, a French territory, British police could not ever arrest him. Nayak also took care of the arms collected in Rodda company arms heist.

Aftermath
In 1919 he became the member of French India Legislative Assembly and went to Pondicherry conference in 1920. Nayak developed close relation with Sri Aurobindo and kept regular contact with him. He also attached with the social works organised by Prabartak Sangha and became editor of Prabartak magazine started by Motilal Roy.

References

1897 births
1982 deaths
Scottish Church College alumni
University of Calcutta alumni
Indian revolutionaries
Indian nationalists
Indian Hindus
Bengali Hindus
People from Hooghly district
Swadeshi activists
Indian independence activists from West Bengal